Kenneth Allen Shipp (February 3, 1929 – March 5, 2012) was an American college and professional football coach. He served as an offensive coordinator and receivers coach in the National Football League (NFL) and briefly as the interim head coach of the New York Jets during the 1975 season. He assumed the job after the firing of Charley Winner, who was 2–7 on the season. The team was 1–4 under Shipp.

Shipp was noted for his sense of humor as an NFL coach. He had stints at Trinity, Florida State, Tulsa, South Carolina and Miami before entering the NFL, where he had positions with St. Louis and New Orleans. Archie Manning, whom Shipp coached in New Orleans, describes him as "a smart man and a good coach." A 1947 graduate of Middle Tennessee State University, he is the namesake of the Ken Shipp Endowed Scholarship at his alma mater as well as the Ken Shipp Scholarship Fund of the Community Foundation of Middle Tennessee.

Ken Shipp died in Murfreesboro, Tennessee on March 5, 2012, aged 83.

References

External links
 Ken Shipp at Pro Football Reference

1929 births
2012 deaths
Detroit Lions coaches
Houston Oilers coaches
Miami Hurricanes football coaches
Middle Tennessee Blue Raiders football players
Montreal Alouettes coaches
National Football League offensive coordinators
New Orleans Saints coaches
New York Jets coaches
Sportspeople from Nashville, Tennessee
St. Louis Cardinals (football) coaches
Tulsa Golden Hurricane football coaches
People from Old Hickory, Tennessee
New York Jets head coaches